The 1988–89 season was Sport Lisboa e Benfica's 85th season in existence and the club's 55th consecutive season in the top flight of Portuguese football, covering the period from 1 July 1988 to 30 June 1989. Benfica competed domestically in the Primeira Divisão and the Taça de Portugal, and participated in the UEFA Cup after finishing second in the previous league.

After leading Benfica to their sixth European Cup Final, Toni remained in charge of the team. He lost Rui Águas and Dito to Porto in a controversial case known as "Ademir affair"; but new signings such as Valdo Filho, Vata, Ricardo Gomes, and Ademir Alcântara helped guide the team to the 28th league title. Despite several draws in the first half of the season, and two losses between both halves, Benfica was much more regular. Several consecutive wins opened a six-point lead over Porto, with the title arriving on 7 May. Benfica also contested the 1989 Taça de Portugal Final, but lost it to Belenenses.

Season summary
For the new season former assistant manager, Toni remained in charge of the team after leading them to the European Cup Final. The off-season was marked by tension between Porto and Benfica, after the first signed Rui Águas and Dito, breaking a 20-year gentlemen's agreement of not signing each other's players. The dispute boiled down to the signing of Ademir Alcântara, with Porto accusing Benfica of stealing the player. It became known as the "Ademir affair". To replace Águas and Dito, Benfica signed Vata and Ricardo Gomes, and added Brazilian international Valdo Filho, amidst several others, including the aforementioned Ademir. The pre-season began on 18 July, with medical tests. The next day, Benfica travelled to Lamego for eleven days of training sessions. Afterwards, they embarked on a tour to the Netherlands, where they competed in the Amsterdam Tournament from 5 to 7 August. Their presentation game occurred on the 11 with Grêmio, and they closed the pre-season with a second tournament, the Marlboro Cup in New York. This caused the opening game with Penafiel, scheduled for 21 August to be postponed to 14 September.

Benfica league campaign started with two draws, followed by three wins which allowed them to reach first place, matched with Belenenses. They dropped to second after a draw with Marítimo but three more wins helped them regain first place, now isolated with a point in hand. Their next match was a Clássico with second-place Porto, ending in a draw. Until Christmas, Benfica increased their lead to four points. However, they lost for the first time in the next match, with Boavista, followed by a second consecutive loss with Penafiel, which did cause them to lose their first place because Porto also lost. In the following weeks, Benfica racked up wins and increased their lead to six points by March. The Clássico on the 29th match-day helped define the course of the remainder of the season. It was Porto's last hope of closing the gap, but Benfica did not concede and left with a draw. Porto manager Artur Jorge said that his team made Benfica look better than it was. Toni responded by saying that Benfica was as happy as Porto had been in Estádio da Luz. Five more consecutive wins and Benfica could have won the title at match-day 35, but drew two-equal with Vitória de Setúbal. A week later, Benfica beat Estrela da Amadora and confirmed their 28th league title. Vata, with only 16 goals won Bola de Prata for top scorer.

Nonetheless, there was still the 1989 Taça de Portugal Final with Belenenses to play. The Belém-side scored first, but Vata levelled it in the 74th minute. A few minutes later, a goal from Juanico, gave the Cup to Belenenses. Diamantino Miranda said the reason Belenenses had won was of their excessive aggressiveness with referee Alder Dante complacent to everything. Toni in the other hand, already knew he was losing his position to Sven-Göran Eriksson. Shéu retired after 17-year career at the club.

Competitions

Overall record

Primeira Divisão

League table

Results by round

Matches

Taça de Portugal

UEFA Cup

First round

Second round

Friendlies

Player statistics
The squad for the season consisted of the players listed in the tables below, as well as staff member Toni (manager), Jesualdo Ferreira (assistant manager), Eusébio (assistant manager), Gaspar Ramos (Director of Football), Bernardo Vasconcelos (Doctor), Amílcar Miranda (Doctor), Asterónimo Araújo (Masseur), Manuel Jorge (Physiotherapist).

|}

Transfers

In

Out

Out by loan

Notes

References

Bibliography

S.L. Benfica seasons
Benfica
Portuguese football championship-winning seasons